The 1994 EA-Generali Ladies Linz was a women's tennis tournament played on indoor carpet courts at the Intersport Arena in Linz, Austria that was part of Tier III of the 1994 WTA Tour. It was the 8th edition of the tournament and was held from 7 February through 13 February 1994. Fifth-seeded Sabine Appelmans won the singles title.

Finals

Singles

 Sabine Appelmans defeated  Meike Babel 6–1, 4–6, 7–6
 It was Appelmans' 1st singles title of the year and the 4th of her career.

Doubles

 Eugenia Maniokova /  Leila Meskhi defeated  Åsa Carlsson /  Caroline Schneider 6–2, 6–2
 It was Maniokova's 1st title of the year and the 3rd of her career. It was Meskhi's only title of the year and the 9th of her career.

External links
 WTA tournament profile
 ITF tournament edition details

EA-Generali Ladies Linz
Linz Open
EA-Generali Ladies Linz
EA-Generali Ladies Linz
Generali